The Musto Skiff is a single-handed sailing skiff with a length of .

History
It was designed in 1999 for the 2000 Olympic Class trials in Quiberon by Joachim Harpprecht, where it won every race in the single-handed dinghy competition.  Since then, the class has attained World Sailing international status and is sailed in 20 countries worldwide. 
It is built by Ovington Boats Ltd in England.

At the time of the design, the concept of a single-handed skiff was first met with scepticism by many observers, very similar to the initial reaction after the introduction of the 49er in 1996. The boat remains challenging to sail, and really shows its strengths when raced. World Championships occur annually and regularly usually attract in excess of 70 sailors from over 10 nations.

In 2016, the class association agreed to continue its branding as the 'Musto Skiff', in a naming rights deal with the Musto clothing company.

Events

World Championship

References

External links
 Musto Skiff Class Association

Dinghies
1990s sailboat type designs
Sailboat types built by Ovington Boats